The Estadio BBVA, nicknamed "El Gigante de Acero" (Spanish for "The Steel Giant"), formerly known as the Estadio BBVA Bancomer, is a stadium developed by FEMSA and C.F. Monterrey in Guadalupe, Greater Monterrey. The stadium replaced the Estadio Tecnológico as the home of Monterrey, ending 63 years of residency at that stadium. The project was met with controversy, stemming from multiple accusations of the construction as an apparent impediment to wildlife growth on a local scale by deforesting 24.5 hectares of forest neighboring a natural protected area that houses 106 animal species, including 8 endangered or protected species such as the yellow headed parrot. It was inaugurated on 2 August 2015 with the eighth edition of the Eusébio Cup, where Monterrey defeated Benfica 3–0. The stadium is expected to host matches for the 2026 FIFA World Cup.

Design 
The stadium was designed by multinational architecture firm Populous along with the Mexican firm VFO. Christopher Lee of Populous, was the lead designer for the project. Construction began in August 2011 and was completed in July 2015.

The stadium was opened in 2015 with a capacity of 51,000 people, making it the fourth largest in Mexico. Built at a cost of US$200 million, it was the most expensive stadium in Mexico at the time of its construction. The owners soon added more seats, expanding the capacity to 53,500 in 2016. It has a grass surface, suites, a club-themed restaurant, a club lounge, and high-end interior and exterior design. The inclination of the grandstand is 34 degrees, and the distance between the field and seats is the minimum allowed by FIFA, providing closeness to the action.

Estadio BBVA received a silver certification from the Leadership in Energy and Environmental Design for its sustainable design. It was the first football stadium in North America to earn the certification.

Permeable area 

More than a third of the total land area are green areas. This proportion exceeds the current regulations. These green areas are used to filter rainwater, which will contribute to the recharge of aquifers. Parking lots are evenly distributed around the stadium, including wooded areas to achieve integration with the Ecological Park. These areas are divided into zones, which are integrated into the landscape and topography. The northern boundary to the Rio La Silla is a wooded trail area that connects the stadium with the New Ecological Park. This ecological park and parking are also green areas, with a landscape design that blends with the surrounding environment, with only trees and plants of the region to facilitate preservation and adaptation to the environment.

Association Football events

2022 CONCACAF W Championship

The 2022 CONCACAF W Championship held in Mexico, the stadium hosted 8 matches:

2026 FIFA World Cup
Estadio BBVA will be one of three Mexican venues to host multiple matches during the 2026 FIFA World Cup.

Concerts

See also 

 Estadio Universitario (UANL)
 List of stadiums in Mexico

References

External links

 
 
 Official website Vergara y Fernandez de Ortega Arquitectos

Sports venues in Monterrey
Football venues in Mexico
Sports venues completed in 2015
2026 FIFA World Cup Stadiums